Heavy Metal Be-Bop is a live album by the American jazz fusion group, the Brecker Brothers that was released by Arista Records in 1978. The album also includes the studio track "East River", which reached No. 34 in the UK singles chart in November 1978.

Reception 
AllMusic awarded the album with 3 stars and its review by Paul Kohler states: "Recorded live in New York, this explosive set of jazz, funk, and rock material was without question ahead of its time. Michael and Randy's use of electronically altered saxophone and trumpet sounds is amazing".

Track listing
All compositions by Randy Brecker except where noted.

 "East River" (Neil Jason, Bret Mazur, Kash Monet) — 3:35 – studio recording
 "Inside Out"  — 9:31
 "Some Skunk Funk"  — 6:59
 "Sponge"  — 6:23
 "Funky Sea, Funky Dew" (Michael Brecker) — 8:02
 "Squids"  — 7:56

Charts

Personnel
Randy Brecker – Trumpet and Keyboards
Michael Brecker – Tenor Saxophone
Barry Finnerty – guitars, guitorganiser, background vocals 
Terry Bozzio – drums, background vocals
Neil Jason – bass, lead vocals
Sammy Figueroa – percussion
Rafael Cruz – percussion
Additional musicians on "East River"
Kash Monet – handclaps, percussion, backing vocals
Paul Shaffer – Fender Rhodes
Victoria – tambourine
Jeff Schoen – backing vocals
Roy Herring – backing vocals
Allan Schwartzberg – drums
Bob Clearmountain – handclaps

NOTE: On this specific recording Randy and Michael run their instruments through guitar amplifiers and play with various effects.

References 

1978 live albums
Brecker Brothers albums
Arista Records live albums